Bernd Eibler (born 8 March 1994) is an Austrian football manager who is currently the assistant manager of Major League Soccer club New York Red Bulls. He is one of a growing number of managers who has never played football professionally.

Managerial career

Early career
In 2018, Eibler was hired by the Austrian Football Association to be one of three coaches to help promote women's soccer in Austria by setting up training schools and tournaments across the country.

SV Mattersburg
Eibler began his professional coaching career in January 2019, joining Austrian Football Bundesliga club SV Mattersburg as a video analyst and assistant manager.  He worked for the club for two years until their bankruptcy in August 2020.

New York Red Bulls
On 13 October 2020, Eibler signed with the New York Red Bulls in MLS to serve as an assistant under new manager Gerhard Struber.

References

1994 births
Living people
Expatriate soccer managers in the United States
New York Red Bulls coaches
Austrian football managers
Austrian expatriate football managers